Georges Marchal (10 January 1920 – 28 November 1997) was a French actor.

Born Georges Louis Lucot in Nancy, Meurthe-et-Moselle, France, the strikingly handsome Marchal was discovered in the early-1940s by director Jean Grémillon. By the early 1950s, he had become one of the top male stars of French cinema, second only, perhaps, to actor Jean Marais. He was also a favorite leading man of filmmaker Luis Buñuel, appearing in the director's films La voie lactée, Belle de jour, Cela s'appelle l'aurore, and La mort en ce jardin.

In 1951, Marchal married French actress Dany Robin and together they were a popular couple, playing in the movies La Passagère (1949), La Voyageuse inattendue, Le plus joli péché du monde, Jupiter directed by Gilles Grangier (1952), and Quand sonnera midi directed by Edmond T. Gréville (1958).

On television, Marchal played Claude Jade's father in the TV-series The Island of Thirty Coffins, and appeared as Richelieu, and Philippe IV, and in adaptations of Balzac, Hugo, George Sand and Colette.

Divorced from Dany Robin since 1969, Marchal married Michele Heyberger in 1983. He had two children, Robin and Frédérique. Marchal retired in 1989 and died, age 77, on 28 November 1997 in Maurens, Dordogne, France.

Filmography

Film

Television

External links
 

1920 births
1997 deaths
Actors from Nancy, France
French male film actors
French male television actors
20th-century French male actors